A  broadcast signal intrusion is the hijacking of broadcast signals of radio, television stations, cable television broadcast feeds or satellite signals without permission or license. Hijacking incidents have involved local TV and radio stations as well as cable and national networks.

Although television, cable, and satellite broadcast signal intrusions tend to receive more media coverage, radio station intrusions are more frequent, as many simply rebroadcast a signal received from another radio station. All that is required is an FM transmitter that can overpower the same frequency as the station being its rebroadcast. Other methods that have been used in North America to intrude on legal broadcasts include breaking into the transmitter area and splicing audio directly into the feed.

As a cable television operator connects itself in the signal path between individual stations and the system's subscribers, broadcasters have fallen victim to signal tampering on cable systems on multiple occasions.

Notable incidents

Southern Television 

On November 26, 1977, an audio message, purporting to come from outer space and conveyed by an individual named ‘Vrillon’ of the ‘Ashtar Galactic Command’, was broadcast during an ITN news bulletin on Southern Television in the United Kingdom. The intrusion did not entirely affect the video signal but replaced the program audio with a six-minute speech about the destiny of the human race and a disaster to affect "your world and the beings on other worlds around you". The IBA confirmed that it was the first time such a transmission had been made.

Captain Midnight 

At 12:32 a.m. Eastern Time on April 27, 1986, HBO (Home Box Office) had its satellite signal feed from its operations center on Long Island in Hauppauge, New York interrupted by a man calling himself "Captain Midnight". The interruption occurred during a presentation of The Falcon and the Snowman. The intrusion lasted between 4 and 5 minutes and was seen by viewers along the East Coast. The man, who during the interruption also threatened to hijack the signals of Showtime and The Movie Channel, was later caught and identified as John R. MacDougall of Ocala, Florida. He was prosecuted shortly thereafter. Authorities were tipped off by a man from Wisconsin in a phone booth at a rest area of Interstate Highway 75 in Gainesville, Florida. The man filing the report said that he overheard MacDougall bragging about the incident.

MacDougall's guilt was confirmed by an FCC investigation that showed he was alone at Central Florida Teleport at the time of the incident and a recording of the jamming video showed that the text was created by a character generator at that location. MacDougall pled guilty and was fined $5,000 and served a year of probation.

MacDougall was able to perform the intrusion while working a second job as a master control operator at a satellite teleport in Florida, where he worked to make ends meet due to declining income from his satellite TV equipment business. He stated that he did it because he was frustrated with HBO's service rates and that it was hurting his business selling satellite dishes (hence his second job at the teleport). The message, placed over SMPTE color bars, broadcast by MacDougall read:

Max Headroom incidents 

On the night of November 22, 1987, an unidentified man wearing a Max Headroom mask appeared on the signals of two television stations in Chicago, Illinois. WGN-TV, owned by Tribune Broadcasting, was hijacked first. The intrusion occurred during the sports report on its 9:00 p.m. newscast and lasted about 25 seconds. Next came PBS affiliate WTTW, where the man was seen and heard uttering garbled remarks before dropping his pants, partially exposing his buttocks, and was then spanked with a flyswatter by a woman wearing a French maid costume before normal programming resumed. This second interception occurred at about 11:00 p.m. during an episode of the Doctor Who serial, "Horror of Fang Rock", and lasted almost 90 seconds. None of the individuals responsible for the intrusion have been identified. This incident got the attention of the CBS Evening News the next day and was talked about nationwide. The HBO incident was also mentioned in the same news report.

The Playboy Channel religious message 
A broadcast of the movie "Three Daughters" on the Playboy Channel was disrupted with a text-only religious message on Sunday, September 6, 1987. The message read, "Thus sayeth the Lord thy God: Remember the Sabbath and keep it holy. Repent, the kingdom of Heaven is at hand." (from the Bible verses Exodus 20:8 and Matthew 4:17).

Thomas Haynie, an employee of the Christian Broadcasting Network, was convicted of satellite piracy in connection with the incident. Haynie, who pleaded his innocence, was the first person convicted under a new federal law which had made satellite hacking a felony following the Captain Midnight incident.

According to investigators, it was the religious content of the transmission and the type of equipment used that drew them to CBN. The jamming signal left behind subtle technical clues that were captured on a VHS recording made at the Playboy Channel's uplink at the time of the event – like finding "fingerprints" in the video. After investigators were confident that they identified the brand of transmitter and character generator from the video, they concluded that CBN was the culprit. Haynie, of Virginia Beach, Virginia, was on duty at his job as an uplink engineer at the time of the jamming.

CBN maintained that the FCC's case was entirely circumstantial since there were no witnesses and the signal could not be traced to a point of origin. During the investigation, experts on both sides attempted to recreate the incident with CBN's equipment. According to CBN spokesman Dino McCann, they were unsuccessful. Furthermore, CBN asserted that there was not enough power for Haynie to jam Playboy's signal but during the trial, government witnesses said the CBN station was capable of interfering with satellite transmissions.

After initially being deadlocked, the jury eventually sided with the prosecution and convicted Haynie on two of six counts. (Haynie was acquitted of similar charges of interfering with the American Exxxtasy channel; a recording of the event was of such poor quality that it was unusable.) Haynie received three years of probation, a $1,000 fine, and 150 hours of community service.

"Telewizja Solidarność" (TV Solidarity) 
In September 1985, four astronomers at Poland's University of Toruń (Zygmunt Turło, Leszek Zaleski, Piotr Łukaszewski, and Jan Hanasz) used a ZX Spectrum home computer, a synchronizing circuit, and a transmitter to superimpose messages in support of the labor movement Solidarność (Solidarity) over state-run television broadcasts in Toruń, including an episode of 07 zgłoś się. The messages read "Dość podwyżek cen, kłamstw I represji. Solidarność Toruń" ("Enough price increases, lies, and repressions. Solidarity Toruń") and "Bojkot wyborów naszym obowiązkiem." ("It is our duty to boycott the election", referring to the Sejm elections of 1985) with the Solidarity logo. The four men were eventually discovered and were charged with "possession of an unlicensed radio transmitter and publication of materials that could cause public unrest". At their sentencing, the judge noted their prize-winning work in the Polish scientific community and gave each of them probation and a fine of the equivalent of US$100 each (or 3,000,000 old złoty, 300 PLN in today's currency).

Soviet pirate broadcasting 
The broadcast signal intrusion was a common practice in the Soviet Union during the 1970s and 1980s due to the absence of and high demand for any non-government broadcasting. As early as 1966, there was a report of an incident in the city of Kaluga where an 18-year-old had broadcast a hoax announcement that nuclear war had broken out with the United States.

In the mid-1970s so many pirates were operating around the city of Arkhangelsk, especially at night, that local people were urged to telephone reports of violators to a special number.

Hijackers using call signs such as "Cucumber", "Radio Millimeter", "Green Goat", "Fortune", and others, would overpower the signal on relay stations for wired radio networks to transmit their programming, or transmit into wired radio networks during gaps in regular programming. Even though the incidents appear to have been fairly common according to reports from the BBC, most were not publicly acknowledged for policy reasons. Reports in newspapers typically referred to the hijackers as "radio hooligans broadcasting drivel, rudeness, vulgarity, uncensored expressions, and trashy music". State news organizations also attempted smear campaigns against such pirate broadcasters, claiming that they had interfered with a state frequency used by Aeroflot, "preventing a doctor in an air ambulance from transmitting information about a patient".

2002 Falun Gong hijackings 
On 16 February 2002, television signals in the Chinese city of Anshan were briefly hijacked by members of the Falun Gong cult movement in order to clarify the events of the Tiananmen Square self-immolation incident of the previous year. On 5 March 2002, further intrusions took place on cable television channels in the cities of Changchun and Songyuan, protesting persecution by the Chinese government. Different sources vary as to the length of the intrusion, with figures cited including 10 minutes, 50 minutes or even as long as four hours. In September of the same year, 15 people were convicted of roles in the incident and were given prison terms of up to 20 years. On 9 September, Falun Gong followers again disrupted broadcasting, this time targeting nationwide satellite broadcasting. By 2010, several of those involved had reportedly died in prison.

2006 Lebanon War 
During the 2006 Lebanon War, Israel overloaded the satellite transmission of Hezbollah's Al Manar TV to broadcast anti-Hezbollah propaganda. One spot showed Hezbollah leader Hassan Nasrallah with crosshairs superimposed on his image followed by three gunshots and a voice saying "Your day is coming" and shots of the Israeli Air Force destroying targets in Lebanon.

WBLI and WBAB 
On the morning of Wednesday, May 17, 2006, the signal of Babylon, New York, FM radio station WBAB was hijacked for about 90 seconds while the signal jammers broadcast the song "Nigger Hatin' Me" by the 1960s-era white supremacist country singer Johnny Rebel. Roger Luce, the station's morning host, said at the time, "Whatever that was - it was very racist... 22 years at this radio station - I've never seen anything like this."

The incident made all the local newscasts that night.  The next morning, it made the front page on Newsday with the headline "JACKED FM". The station's new general manager, John Shea, said, "I've only been here a week and we get hijacked." Former program director John Olsen said, "This was not some child's prank, this was a federal offense."

The hijack was likely accomplished by overpowering the studio transmitter link (STL) signal to the transmitter in Dix Hills. A signal hijacking with the same song happened to WBAB's sister station WBLI about two weeks earlier on a Sunday night.

"The Winker's Song" incidents 
In June and July 2017, Mansfield 103.2 FM, a local radio station in Mansfield, Nottinghamshire, England in the United Kingdom, had its signal intruded at least eight times during outside broadcasts. During these intrusions, "The Winker's Song (Misprint)" was played. , the perpetrator had not been identified.

2022 Russian invasion of Ukraine 
On February 26, 2022, the hacker group Anonymous, as part of the cyber war declared to Russia, hacked several pro-Kremlin TV channels (Channel One Russia, Russia-1 and others), broadcasting a poem written by the singer Monatik about the Russo-Ukrainian war with its footage and Ukrainian music.

On May 9, 2022, during Russia's Victory Day parade in Moscow, Russian TV listings were hacked to display information on Putin's war crimes and to promote the truth about Russia's invasion of Ukraine using various messages. The names of every TV station were changed to blood is on your hands and other phrases used in the TV listings included television and the government is lying and your hands are covered in blood from the deaths of thousands of Ukrainians and their children.

Other incidents

Television signal intrusions 

During the second inning from Game 1 of the 1988 World Series (known for Kirk Gibson’s famous walk-off Home Run) on October 15, 1988, an unidentified technician from NBC affiliate WMGT-TV in Macon, Georgia was fired after the station's on-air feed replaced 10 seconds of the World Series with a black-and-white pornographic film during its broadcast. The hijack made statewide headlines and the station's manager, L.A. Sturdivant, revealed a statement saying that it was triggered as an accident, not deliberated planned, and was being "treated as a serious matter." Sturdivant received many phone calls after the hijack from viewers in the market on the length of the hijack but corrects it by Sturdivant shortly after.

On January 3, 2007, in Australia, during a broadcast of an episode of the Canadian television series Mayday (known in Australia as Air Crash Investigation) on the Seven Network, an audio signal unexpectedly started playing, clearly saying in an American accent, "Jesus Christ, help us all, Lord." This same voice message continued to repeat itself over and over during the show for a total of six minutes. A spokesman for Seven later denied that the transmission was a prank or a security breach and claimed that the repeated line was part of the original broadcast and said, "Jesus Christ, one of the Nazarenes", although there is hardly any similarity between the two phrases. A subsequent investigation by independent researchers revealed that the invading transmission was actually from a videotaped news broadcast of a civilian truck being ambushed in the Iraq War. It remains unknown whether or not this was an intentional act of television piracy or a genuine glitch of some sort.

On March 12, 2007, during a 9 p.m. airing of an Ion Life rebroadcast of a Tom Brokaw-hosted NBC special, State of U.S. Health Care, on Phoenix, Arizona TV station KPPX-TV, a station employee inserted about 30 seconds of a pornographic film into the broadcast, prompting telephone calls to local news media outlets and the local cable provider, Cox Communications. Parent company Ion Media Networks conducted a rigorous investigation into what they called "an intolerable act of human sabotage", and shortly thereafter, announced that the employee found to be responsible had been fired, threatening further legal action.

On June 17, 2007, an intrusion incident occurred on Czech Television's Sunday morning program Panorama, which shows panoramic shots of Prague and various locations across the country, especially mountain resorts. One of the cameras, located in Černý Důl in Krkonoše, had been tampered with on-site and its video stream was replaced with the hackers' own, which contained CGI of a small nuclear explosion in the local landscape, ending in white noise. The broadcast looked authentic enough; the only clue for the viewers was the Web address of the artist group Ztohoven, which had already performed several reality hacking incidents before. Czech Television considered legal action against the group, and tourism workers in the area expressed outrage (since the program serves to promote tourism in the areas shown).

On July 13, 2007, a grainy photo of a man and woman interrupted Washington, D.C. ABC affiliate WJLA-TV's digital or HD signal. The picture was not transmitted over the analog signal, however. The incident was deemed a genuine signal intrusion by various websites but has since been confirmed to be the result of an older HDTV encoder malfunctioning in the early morning hours and going undetected. Station management stated that the image was from an advertisement for The Oprah Winfrey Show. A similar incident took place in the Cincinnati Metropolitan Area on March 24, 2016, when a grainy photo of a singer performing interrupted a Comcast headend multiple times. The incident was reported as an unexpected trigger to its Trilithic EASyPLUS Emergency Alert System encoder/decoder while activating a Required Weekly Test. Officials from its executive customer relations department said that one of its video encoders experienced a technical malfunction without incident.

On February 11, 2013, Great Falls, Montana CBS affiliate KRTV had their Emergency Alert System hijacked with an audible message warning viewers that "the bodies of the dead are rising from their graves and attacking the living." Later the same night in Marquette, Michigan and the early morning hours in La Crosse, Wisconsin, the same type of hijacking and reference to a "zombie invasion" was made over the EAS systems of CBS affiliate WKBT-DT, ABC affiliate WBUP and PBS member station WNMU during primetime programming. Shortly afterward, PBS affiliate KENW of Portales, New Mexico was struck with a similar hacking incident, repeating similar information regarding zombies; however, this led to the arrest of the hacker of the four television stations.

In March 2017, intruders broadcast pornographic content for approximately 15 minutes on Touba TV, an Islamic TV channel in Senegal run by the Mouride Sufi order. In a statement, the channel's management "unreservedly condemn[ed] this criminal act which seems to be sabotage and a satanic trick".

On October 8, 2022, during the Mahsa Amini protests in Iran, the state-run TV channel Islamic Republic TV was hacked by a group going by the name of "Adalat Ali". The screen briefly showed a man in a mask, before switching to a black screen containing Supreme Leader Ali Khamenei engulfed in CGI flames with a target on his forehead, pictures of four women recently killed in the protests and the audio message "Women, life, freedom" on repeat. The hack lasted 12 seconds, before cutting back to a bewildered TV presenter.

Cable network feed intrusions 
On May 1, 2007, a Comcast headend replaced Disney Junior's program Handy Manny with hard-core pornography for viewers in Lincroft, New Jersey. Comcast stated it was investigating the event's cause but did not announce its findings to the public.

On February 1, 2009, a second Comcast headend, in Tucson, Arizona, replaced NBC affiliate KVOA's signal with graphic footage from the pornographic video Wild Cherries 5 in portions of Arizona for 28 seconds, interrupting Super Bowl XLIII between the Arizona Cardinals and the Pittsburgh Steelers during the fourth quarter. Comcast claimed "Our initial investigation suggests this was an isolated malicious act. We are conducting a thorough investigation to determine who was behind this." KVOA also announced that it will be investigating the incident. On February 4, 2011, 38-year-old former Cox Cable employee Frank Tanori Gonzalez of Marana was arrested by the FBI and local police about the case. Later that October, Frank was pleaded guilty for two counts of computer tampering and was sentenced to three years in probation, as well as a $1,000 fine to the Arizona attorney general's anti-racketeering fund.

In the morning hours of March 16, 2010, Raleigh area Time Warner Cable's transmission from both Kids and Kids Preschool On Demand channels in the Research Triangle counties of Johnston, Wake, Wayne, and Wilson in North Carolina (including the cities of Raleigh and Goldsboro) was replaced by Playboy TV for approximately two hours, while other TWC cable systems in the area outside the four counties only revealed a black screen. An executive from TWC reported to CBS (now NBC) station WRAL replied that it "was a technical malfunction that caused the wrong previews to be shown" on their kids' on-demand channels.

On April 20, 2012, three minutes of a gay pornographic film was broadcast during a morning news show on the Channel Zero-owned independent station CHCH-DT in Hamilton, Ontario, for Shaw Cable viewers. The night before, a cable was cut; while it was being fixed on the morning of the incident, the adult programming was spliced into CHCH's feed.

Satellite feed intrusions 
On September 7, 2012, the Disney Junior block on Disney Channel was interrupted on the Dish Network, replacing 6 minutes of Lilo & Stitch with a portion of a hardcore pornographic movie.

On March 11, 2016, private satellite dish owners in Israel watching HaAh HaGadol (the Israeli version of Big Brother) on Channel 2 had their show interrupted by propaganda videos from Hamas. The disruption lasted a little over three and a half minutes.

Radio signal intrusions 
The BBC's radio broadcast of a musical program on October 14, 1941, was interrupted by Nazi Germans shouting false questions and statements to Britains on "how much money Winston Churchill has been paid by Germans," and saying that "the Germans have being swindled and was led up the garden path and sold to America." The voice led to a target of "Harassing Harry", a counterpart of Russia's "Ivan the Terrible" who heckles German broadcasters becoming a welcome diversion to British broadcasting. The wavering intensity of the voice often gave a similar quality voice of Donald Duck which led some listeners to name him "Von Donald." Later, the heckler began interspersing comments between British news bulletins from the BBC. Some of the hecklings include the voice telling listeners to wait for the following day in the headline on the Germans keeping up their pressure on Ukraine, and the voice saying that a big offensive swept over Northern France has been shot down.  

The Federal Bureau of Investigation made major headlines on November 24, 1943, after a 90-second interruption of a Nazi man speaking rapidly over a CBS Radio program only on WOKO-AM in Albany, New York. The FBI later stated that the interruption was reported as a mistake in telephone transmission "or possibly from an enemy broadcast" and reported that there is no "direct allegation" of the latter. 

During the 2020 United States Presidential Election, the radio station WWEI 105.5 FM (which is owned by Audacy, Inc.) (at the time Entercom) and serves Springfield, Massachusetts), was hijacked and interrupted with a voice that said, "Don't be a chump, vote for Trump." As of November 4, attempts to contact the FCC were unsuccessful.

See also 
 Pirate radio
 Pirate television
 Culture jamming
 Radio jamming
 Zoombombing

References

External links 
 CBS News report on Max Headroom Chicago Takeover at YouTube
 Statement made by art group ZTOHOVEN regarding their attack at the public service broadcaster in the Czech Republic
 An artistic group interfered with the Czech TV broadcast with fictitious nuclear explosion
Video of the "Telewizja Solidarność" signal intrusions at YouTube
Polish Tv pirate (This page has moved)

Federal Communications Commission
Satellite television
Cable television
Broadcast engineering
Security